"Lead the Way" / "La'boon" is the ninth Japanese single (second double A-side) by South Korean girl group T-ara on March 5, 2014. It served as the second single from the group's third Japanese album Gossip Girls.

Background and release 
On March 19, a preview of the "Lead The Way" Music Video was aired on Japanese television and was uploaded on the 20th on UNIVERSAL MUSIC JAPAN's official website and YouTube channel.

"Lead the way" is described as "a medium tempo ballad that depicts a "secret" love, with a beautiful lyrical melody that touches the heartstrings". La'boon is inspired by "Arabian Nights", "the sound has a unique and exotic atmosphere. Both songs are Japanese original songs by Japanese writers

Both songs were later re-released on the group's third Japanese album Gossip Girls. 

The single was released in three versions: eight limited CD+DVD editions, one type-A and seven type B (one per member), a box edition, and a regular CD Only edition. Each limited edition B features a DVD with a solo version of "Lead the way" PV featuring one solo member. The box edition includes all six versions in one DVD and includes a 16-page photobook. All editions include one trading card with a serial code. Limited editions come in a special package while the Regular edition comes in a normal paper case.

Commercial performance 
The single debuted and peaked at number seven on Oricon daily chart, it fell to number nine for two weeks before re-peaking at number seven. It charted for seven days on Top 15. On the weekly chart, it reached number eight on the Oricon Weekly chart and charted for a total of five weeks selling 12,688 copies the first week.

The single peaked at number thirty-two on the monthly chart with a total of 16,230 copies sold.

Track listing 
Credits adapted from Tower Records

Charts

Release history

References 

2014 singles
T-ara songs
Japanese-language songs